Cambio 21 (Change 21) is a Chilean periodical, created as an online newspaper in 2008, and published as a printed weekly since 9 March 2011.

Print edition
After almost three years of exclusively appearing on the Internet, on 9 March 2011, the printed version of Cambio 21 appeared, published weekly.

The weekly Cambio 21 is printed and distributed by Copesa.

References

External link
 

2008 establishments in Chile
2011 establishments in Chile
Chilean news websites
Newspapers published in Chile
Newspapers established in 2008
Publications established in 2011
Spanish-language newspapers